Patrick Gidudu is a retired Anglican bishop in the Anglican Church of Uganda: he was Bishop of Mbale from 2008  to 2021.

References

21st-century Anglican bishops in Uganda
Anglican bishops of Mbale
Year of birth missing (living people)
Living people
Place of birth missing (living people)